The 1957 Claxton Shield was the 18th annual Claxton Shield, it was held in Perth, Western Australia. The participants were South Australia, New South Wales, Victoria and Western Australia. The winners were the South Australian team, who won their first title since the 1936 Claxton Shield. The year marked the centenary celebrations for baseball in Victoria.

References

1957 in baseball
1957 in Australian sport
1957
July 1957 sports events in Australia
August 1957 sports events in Australia